Frances Stewart may refer to:

Frances Stewart (economist) (born 1940), professor of development economics
Frances Henrietta Stewart (1883–1962), British politician and supporter of Indian nationalism
Frances Stewart (social activist) (1840–1916), Australian-born New Zealand social activist
Frances Benedict Stewart, Chilean-born American citizen and spokesperson for the Bahá'í Faith
Frankie Stewart Silver (died 1833), born Frances Stewart
Frances Stewart, Duchess of Richmond (1647–1702), famous for refusing to be mistress of Charles II
Frances Stewart, Duchess of Lennox (1578–1639), wife of Ludovic Stewart, Duke of Richmond and Lennox
Frances Stewart, Marchioness of Londonderry (1751–1833)

See also
Francis Stewart (disambiguation)